Semen collection refers to the process of obtaining semen from human males or other animals with the use of various methods, for the purposes of artificial insemination, or medical study (usually in fertility clinics). Semen can be collected via masturbation (e. g., from stallions and canids), prostate massage, artificial vagina, penile vibratory stimulation (vibroejaculation) and electroejaculation. Semen can be collected from endangered species for cryopreservation of genetic resources.

By species

Humans
Methods of semen collection from humans include:
 Masturbation, directing the sample into a clean cup. This is the most common way to collect a semen sample.
 Sexual intercourse using a special type of condom known as a collection condom.  Collection condoms are made from silicone or polyurethane, as latex is somewhat harmful to sperm. Many men prefer collection condoms to masturbation, and some religions prohibit masturbation entirely.  Adherents of religions that prohibit contraception may use collection condoms with holes pricked in them. However, such samples are inferior to the ones collected by masturbation in clean cup.
 Coitus interruptus (withdrawal).  With this technique, the man removes his penis from the vagina near the end of intercourse and ejaculates into a wide-necked cup or bottle. If an analysis of semen quality is required, this technique is generally not recommended as part of the ejaculation could be lost which decreases the accuracy of the results.
 Surgical extraction, if for example a blockage in the vas deferens is suspected to impede fertility, semen can be taken directly from the epididymis. Such a collection is called percutaneous epididymal sperm aspiration (PESA). Alternatively, the testicular tissue itself, instead of the sperm produced can be investigated. Then, the collecting method is called testicular sperm extraction (TESE). A Cochrane review found insufficient evidence to recommend any specific surgical sperm retrieval technique for men with azoospermia undergoing intracytoplasmic sperm injection (ICSI).
 Penile vibratory stimulation (PVS) and electroejaculation are two other alternatives for men with anejaculation due to spinal cord injury. The penile vibratory stimulator is a plier-like device that is placed around the glans penis to stimulate it by vibration, and provides the first-line method for sperm retrieval in spinal cord injury patients with anejaculation.

The best specimen is produced when a short period of 3–5 days of abstinence is observed. More prolonged period does not yield better results.

Cattle

Horses 
For semen collection from stallions, the most common method used is an artificial vagina; after collecting semen, it is tested, diluted, then stored according to the intended use. Semen can be either liquid or frozen. There are many kinds of preservatives used in dilution with semen - most contain energy and antibiotics for liquid, and protection from freezing for frozen semen. Many studies are ongoing to improve preservation,  increase liquid semen storage time, and reduce or remove bacteria from semen.

Canids

Dogs

In order to collect semen from a male dog, an artificial vagina is prepared, which is a conical thin latex sleeve ending in a sterile collection tube. The inside of the latex sleeve is lightly lubricated.  The male is allowed to sniff a female in estrus.  Experienced studs cooperate readily in the process.  New studs often require encouragement in the form of manual stimulation, also known as "manual ejaculation".  Generally the male will mount the female, and the collector quickly directs the dog's penis into the latex sleeve.   The male ejaculates and the semen is collected in the tube. The semen is then drawn up into a long thin pipette. Prior to ejaculation, the penis is massaged inside its sheath. It is then extruded from its sheath, and the collector massages the dog's erect penis near the base of the bulbus glandis using the thumb and index finger. The dog begins pelvic thrusting movements at the onset of ejaculation.

Wolves
Semen can be collected from wolves via manual stimulation or electroejaculation.

See also
 Canine reproduction#Procedure
 Conception device#Semen collectors
 Collection condom
 Cryoconservation of animal genetic resources#Semen
 Posthumous sperm retrieval
 Semen analysis
 Sperm theft

References

Bibliography
 
 
 
 
 
 
 Schmitt, D. L., and T. B. Hildebrandt. "Manual collection and characterization of semen from Asian elephants (Elephas maximus)." Animal reproduction science 53.1 (1998): 309–314.
 Brown, Janine L., et al. "Successful artificial insemination of an Asian elephant at the National Zoological Park." Zoo Biology 23.1 (2004): 45–63.
 Howard, JoGayle, et al. "Electroejaculation, semen characteristics and serum testosterone concentrations of free-ranging African elephants (Loxodonta africana)." Journal of reproduction and fertility 72.1 (1984): 187-195.

Semen collection from rhinoceroses
 Cave, A. J. E. "THE PROCESSÜS GLANDIS IN THE RHINOCEROTIDAE." Proceedings of the Zoological Society of London. Vol. 143. No. 4. Blackwell Publishing Ltd, 1964.
 Schaffer, Nan, et al. "Ultrasonographic monitoring of artificially stimulated ejaculation in three rhinoceros species (Ceratotherium simum, Diceros bicornis, Rhinoceros unicornus)." Journal of Zoo and Wildlife Medicine (1998): 386-393.
 Walzer, C., H. Pucher, and F. Schwarzenberger. "A restraint chute for semen collection in white rhinoceros (Ceratotherium simum simum)—preliminary results." Proc. Eur. Assoc. Zoo Wildl. Vet.(EAZWV), Paris, France (2000): 7-10.
 Beehler, B. "RESTRAINT CHUTES."
 Schaffer, N. E., et al. "Methods of semen collection in an ambulatory greater one‐horned rhinoceros (rhinoceros unicornis)." Zoo Biology 9.3 (1990): 211-221.
 Roth, Terri L., et al. "Semen collection in rhinoceroses (Rhinoceros unicornis, Diceros bicornis, Ceratotherium simum) by electroejaculation with a uniquely designed probe." Journal of Zoo and Wildlife Medicine 36.4 (2005): 617-627.
 Silinski, S., et al. "Pharmacological methods of enhancing penile erection for ex-copula semen collection in standing white rhinoceros (Ceratotherium simum simum)." Proc. of the combined meeting of the EAZWV and the EWDA. Heidelberg, Germany. 2002.
 O'Brien, J. K., and T. L. Roth. "Post-coital sperm recovery and cryopreservation in the Sumatran rhinoceros (Dicerorhinus sumatrensis) and application to gamete rescue in the African black rhinoceros (Diceros bicornis)." Journal of reproduction and fertility 118.2 (2000): 263–271.

External links

 The men's rooms A British journalist takes a closer look at the phenomenon of semen collection.

Livestock
Male genital procedures
Fertility medicine
Semen
Male masturbation
Artificial insemination